was the progenitor of the Nitta branch family of the Minamoto samurai clan, who fought alongside the Minamoto in the Genpei War. He is also known as Nitta Tarō and Nitta Yoshishige.

His father was Minamoto no Yoshikuni and his grandfather Minamoto no Yoshiie.

In 1156, he fought in the Hogen Rebellion with Taira no Kiyomori. He also fought with Kiyomori in the Heiji Rebellion in 1160 along with his younger brother Minamoto no Yoshiyasu. However he switched sides shortly after the rebellion and fought with the Minamoto in the Genpei War two decades later. He fought in the Battle of Awazu with his brother in 1184, and again in the Battle of Yashima a year later. He died in 1202.

Yoshishige was posthumously awarded the title of Chinjufu-shōgun, or Commander-in-chief of the Defense of the North, in 1611, four centuries after his death, by the second Tokugawa shōgun, Tokugawa Hidetada.

He ordained as a Buddhist monk and received the Dharma name Jōnichi (上西).

References
Papinot, Edmond (1910). Historical and geographical dictionary of Japan. Tokyo: Librarie Sansaisha.

Minamoto clan
Nitta clan
1135 births
1202 deaths
People of Heian-period Japan
People of Kamakura-period Japan
Kamakura period Buddhist clergy